Dhumba lake is located in Mustang district of Nepal at an altitude of 2830 m. It is about 5.5 km west of Jomsom near the Thini village. The lake is about 150 meters long and 100 meters wide. The lake is fed by ice melt from  Mount Nilgiri.

The lake is considered sacred by Buddhists and Hindu pilgrims. According to the legend, once the lake changed to red color. A Buddhist monk performed some rituals and turned it back to natural color. Due to the religious belief, the fishes of the lake is not consumed.

References

Lakes of Nepal
Hindu pilgrimage sites in Nepal
Mustang District
Lakes of Gandaki Province